Shibalidian is the name of a transportational node in Beijing, China. Flanked by several overpasses, it is where the southeastern 4th Ring Road (Beijing) links with the Jingjintang Expressway. The overpass complex consists of Shibalidian North Bridge, Shibalidian Bridge, and Shibalidian South Bridge.

Geographically, it is in southeastern Beijing and relatively far away from the city centre. Nearby lies the Beijing Economic Development Area.

When the Jingjintang Expressway was first opened in late 1993, Shibalidian was an insignificant locality in a then lesser expansive Beijing City. Shibalidian was Exit No. 1 on the Jingjintang Expressway.

With the opening of the 4th Ring Road, Shibalidian rose in importance. With the onslaught of trade, the Beijing Chaoyang Port was set up around Shibalidian, and in 2004, the Beijing Municipal Public Security Ministry relocated its Vehicle Management authorities for the municipality from Beiyuan to Shibalidian.

The eastern stretch of the 4th Ring Road ends in Shibalidian. Until 2001, traffic could not proceed any further, other than switching to the Jingjintang Expressway.

Shibalidian (十八里店) literally means "a shop at 18 li," where a Chinese li equates to 0.5 kilometre. Dian, although translated as shop, may not entail the existence of a special shop in the area. Rather, dian is used as a locality ending.

Road transport in Beijing
Bridges in Beijing
Buildings and structures in Chaoyang District, Beijing